The 2016–17 Biathlon World Cup – Pursuit Men started on Sunday 4 December 2016 in Östersund and finished on Saturday 18 March 2017 in Oslo Holmenkollen. The defending titlist was Martin Fourcade of France.

The small crystal globe winner for the category was Martin Fourcade of France.

Competition format
The  pursuit race is skied over five laps. The biathlete shoots four times at any shooting lane, in the order of prone, prone, standing, standing, totalling 20 targets. For each missed target a biathlete has to run a  penalty loop. Competitors' starts are staggered, according to the result of the previous sprint race.

2015–16 Top 3 standings

Medal winners

Standings

References

Pursuit Men